Guido Davì (born 16 September 1990) is an Italian footballer who plays as a central midfielder for  club Pistoiese.

Career
On 7 August 2014, he reached an agreement with Serie C side Bassano.

On 11 January 2019, he joined Gubbio.

On 5 August 2019, he signed with Modena.

On 19 August 2021, he returned to Juve Stabia.

On 5 August 2022, Davì moved to Pistoiese in Serie D.

References 

1990 births
Living people
Footballers from Palermo
Italian footballers
Association football midfielders
Serie B players
Serie C players
Serie D players
Palermo F.C. players
S.S. Juve Stabia players
Benevento Calcio players
Bassano Virtus 55 S.T. players
FeralpiSalò players
A.S.D. Sicula Leonzio players
A.S. Gubbio 1910 players
Modena F.C. players
U.S. Pistoiese 1921 players